Lasiurus is a genus of Asian and African plants in the grass family, Poaceae, found primarily in arid regions.  The only known species is Lasiurus scindicus, native to drier regions of northern Africa and southwestern Asia, from Morocco and Mali to India.

formerly included
see Loxodera 
 Lasiurus epectinatus – Loxodera caespitosa
 Lasiurus maitlandii – Loxodera ledermannii

Names in other languages
Hindi :Sevan
Rajasthani : Lilon

References

Panicoideae
Bunchgrasses of Africa
Bunchgrasses of Asia
Flora of North Africa
Flora of Western Asia
Grasses of India
Taxa named by Pierre Edmond Boissier